A review of systems (ROS), also called a systems enquiry or systems review, is a technique used by healthcare providers for eliciting a medical history from a patient. It is often structured as a component of an admission note covering the organ systems, with a focus upon the subjective symptoms perceived by the patient (as opposed to the objective signs perceived by the clinician). Along with the physical examination, it can be particularly useful in identifying conditions that do not have precise diagnostic tests.

Examples
Whatever system a specific condition may seem restricted to, it may be reasonable to review all the other systems in a comprehensive history. Different sources describe slightly different systems of organizing the organ systems. However, the following are examples of what can be included. Unspecified and other symptoms can't consider for both HPI and ROS:

There are 14 systems recognized by the Centers for Medicare and Medicaid Services:

The questions may be asked of the patient in a "head to toe" manner.

Relationship to history

For CMS, a "problem pertinent" ROS is limited to the problem(s) identified in the HPI; an "extended" ROS covers an additional 2 to 9 systems, and a "complete" ROS covers at least 10 additional systems.The chances of double dipping should be avoided while taking ROS from History.There are many rules and guidelines a coder must be aware of when it comes to appropriately selecting an Evaluation and Management (EM) code and avoiding doubling dipping is one of them.
"This established patient has had a fever with sore/scratchy throat and severe headache for the past three days. He has had a little nausea but no vomiting. He said his pain is relieved with cold drinks and ibuprofen.
In the above example if you take throat as location in HPI,you can not take sore/scratchy throat in ROS as ENT element. Most of the double dipping will happen in ENT section since it is a combined system. Of note, some would say that the statement of "No known allergies" could be calculated as part of the review of systems (ROS). The statement suggests the patient is not allergic to any medications, which is commonly part of the "past medical history" element.
"The patient was brought up by an aunt;Patient having nasal problems for last 4 days, symptoms including runny nose/ rhinorrhea. Denies cough, no fever, pneumonia, severe headache for the past three days.
In the above example, if you take Nose as location, you can not take runny nose/rhinorrhea in ROS as an ENT element.
Double dipping is against the rules. The common double dipping example (above) uses the elements of HPI (location and associated signs and symptoms) for both the HPI and the ROS.  Double dipping may increase revenue by making it possible to qualify for a higher level of history and as such be considered fraud or abuse. There is a fine line between the signs and symptoms that patient shares in the HPI and those obtained via the ROS. The ROS is a distinct review of systems. For example: if the documentation reads 'patient states that her hip has been painful' credit is not given in both the HPI 'location' and to the MSK (musculoskeletal) review of systems." It goes on to explain that if the patient's complaint is followed by "no other MSK issues" than it can be counted in the ROS as well as the HPI.

In the above

References

Medical terminology